Amy Thomas Howorth (born November 14, 1964) is a politician from Manhattan Beach, California. She is a Democrat. Howorth served as Mayor of Manhattan Beach. She is a current Manhattan Beach City Council member and former Manhattan Beach School Board member. Prior to holding public office, she was the first photo editor at Wired.

Early life and education
Howorth was born in Coshocton, Ohio in 1964. She attended Ohio University (1982-1986) where she earned a Bachelor of Science degree in Telecommunication, with minors in French and Political Science. Her activities and societies in college included Chi Omega and WOUB-TV.

Early career
After college graduation she began a career as a professional photo editor. She began working at Stock Boston (1986-1988) as a photo researcher. In 1988 Howorth, became a photo librarian and editor for WGBH-TV Public Television in Boston, Massachusetts. She then became the original photo editor for Wired in 1993. She later worked as a freelancer.

Community and public service
Before joining the Manhattan Beach School Board in 2003, Howorth was School Site Council President, PTSA Vice President, and Cultural Arts Chair, and Legislative Representative for her sons' school, Robinson Elementary. In 2003, she was elected to the Manhattan Beach School Board where she served 8 years and was President of the board in 2005 and 2008. In 2011, she was elected to the Manhattan Beach City Council and served a one-year term as Manhattan Beach Mayor.

In February 2014, Howorth announced her candidacy for the California's 26th Senate District seat. The seat was held by Senator Ted Lieu, who ran for Congress to replace Congressman Henry Waxman. Howorth lost in the primary election.

She was re-elected to the Manhattan Beach City Council in March 2015. In July 2016, she served on the Rules Committee of the Democratic National Convention as a Hillary Clinton appointee. She was appointed by Los Angeles County Supervisor Janice Hahn to the Commission on Children and Families. Howorth is also a Director of the Clean Power Alliance of Southern California.

Boards and committees
2006-2008 City of Manhattan Beach Facilities Strategic Master Plan Steering Committee
2008-2010 City of Manhattan Beach Inaugural Environmental Task Force

Personal life 
Howorth and her husband, Mark lived in northern California for several years. They later relocated to Manhattan Beach in 1997. She has two sons Ari and Jack. In May 2018, Howorth made a surprise guest appearance on Jimmy Kimmel Live! after attending a meeting in Hollywood.

References

1964 births
Living people
California Democrats
People from Manhattan Beach, California
Mayors of places in California
Women mayors of places in California
Ohio University alumni
People from Coshocton, Ohio
21st-century American women politicians
21st-century American politicians
20th-century American women politicians
20th-century American politicians